The Pop-O-Pies were an American punk rock band from San Francisco, California founded by Joe Callahan (aka Joe Pop-O-Pie) that got their start by repeatedly playing a cover of The Grateful Dead's "Truckin'". Though the band went through many lineup changes, notably featuring members of Mr. Bungle and Faith No More, several recordings would follow. All of them, except for The White EP, can be found on the 2003 CD compilation Pop-O-Anthology 1984-1993.

The Pop-O-Pies were called "absolutely the worst band in California" by the Los Angeles Times.

Discography
Singles
"Truckin'" (7", 1981)
"In Frisco" (7", 1993)

EPs
The White EP (12", 1981)
Joe's Second Record (12", 1984)

Albums
Joe's Third Record (LP, 1985)

Compilations
Pop-O-Anthology 1984-1993 (CD, 2003)

References

External links

CD Baby

Punk rock groups from California
Musical groups from San Francisco